Dichistius is a genus of perciform fishes, the galjoen fishes, native to the Atlantic coast of southern Africa (D. capensis) and the Indian Ocean coast of southern Africa (D. multifasciatus).

Species
The currently recognized species in this genus are:
 Dichistius capensis (G. Cuvier, 1831) (galjoen)
 Dichistius multifasciatus (Pellegrin, 1914) (banded galjoen)

See also
List of fish families

References

Dichistiidae
Ray-finned fish genera